Springfield is a suburb of Johannesburg, South Africa. It is a small industrial suburb located south of the Johannesburg CBD, close to La Rochelle. It is located in Region F of the City of Johannesburg Metropolitan Municipality.

History
Prior to the discovery of gold on the Witwatersrand in 1886, the suburb lay on land on one of the original farms called Turffontein. Springfield became a suburb in 1906.

References

Johannesburg Region F